The Tour of Austria is a stage cycling race held in Austria. From 1949 to 1995 it was a race for amateur cyclists, turning into a professional event in 1996. In 2005 and 2006 it was organised as a 2.1 event on the UCI Europe Tour, becoming a 2.HC event in 2007. The race will become part of the new UCI ProSeries in 2020. Since 2005 it has usually been held in July. Before that, it was seen as an ideal preparation race for the Tour de France.

Winners

External links

 
UCI Europe Tour races
Cycle races in Austria
Recurring sporting events established in 1949
1949 establishments in Austria